The 2014 North Queensland Cowboys season was the 20th in the club's history. Coached by Paul Green and co-captained by Johnathan Thurston and Matthew Scott, they competed in the NRL's 2014 Telstra Premiership.

Season summary
On February 16, the Cowboys won the first trophy in their club's history when they won the inaugural NRL Auckland Nines tournament held at Eden Park in Auckland defeating the Brisbane Broncos, 16-7, in the final. They won the trophy and a prize money cheque of $370,000. Winger Kyle Feldt was awarded the Breakout Player of the Tournament award, while Gavin Cooper, Kane Linnett, James Tamou and Antonio Winterstein were named in the Team of the Tournament. The Cowboys finished the NRL season in 5th place, defeating the Brisbane Broncos in the first week of the finals. They were eliminated a week later by the Sydney Roosters.

Milestones
Round 1: Paul Green recorded his first win as an NRL coach.
Round 1: Kane Linnett played his 50th game for the club.
Round 5: Matthew Wright made his debut for the club.
Round 6: Brent Tate scored the club's 2000th NRL try.
Round 7: Curtis Rona made his NRL debut.
Round 7: Curtis Rona scored his first NRL try.
Round 9: Cameron King made his debut for the club.
Round 10: Johnathan Thurston played his 200th game for the club.
Round 11: Ashton Sims captained the club for the first time.
Round 12: John Asiata made his NRL debut.
Round 17: Tautau Moga made his debut for the club.
Round 17: Sam Hoare made his NRL debut.
Round 17: Zac Santo made his NRL debut.
Round 17: Ben Spina made his NRL debut.
Round 17: Laurie and Ben Spina became the first father-son duo to play for the Cowboys.
Round 17: Jason Taumalolo played his 50th game for the club.
Round 17: Antonio Winterstein scored his 50th career try.
Round 21: Gavin Cooper played his 100th game for the club.
Round 22: Michael Morgan played his 50th game for the club.
Round 22: The Cowboys recorded their biggest ever win (def. Wests Tigers 64-6).
Round 22: The Cowboys recorded their highest ever score (64 points).
Round 26: Johnathan Thurston became the NRL's top point scorer for the 2014 season with 208 points.
Finals Week 2: Johnathan Thurston scored the most points in a season by a Cowboys' player with 234 points.

Squad List

Squad Movement

2014 Gains

2014 Losses

Re-signings

Ladder

Fixtures

Pre-season

NRL Auckland Nines

The NRL Auckland Nines is a pre-season rugby league nines competition featuring all 16 NRL clubs. The 2014 competition was played over two days on February 15 and 16 at Eden Park in Auckland, New Zealand. The Cowbous featured in Pool Yellow and played Canberra, Manly and the Warriors. The top two teams of each pool qualified for the quarter finals.

Pool Play

Finals

Regular season

Finals

Statistics

Source:

Representatives
The following players have played a representative match in 2014

Honours

League
Dally M Medal: Johnathan Thurston
Dally M Five-Eighth of the Year: Johnathan Thurston

Club
Paul Bowman Medal: Johnathan Thurston
Player's Player: Johnathan Thurston
Club Person of the Year: Ashton Sims
Rookie of the Year: John Asiata
Most Improved: Michael Morgan
Member's Player of the Year: Michael Morgan
NYC Player of the Year: Josh Chudleigh

Feeder Clubs

National Youth Competition
 North Queensland Cowboys - 12th, missed finals

Queensland Cup
 Mackay Cutters - 9th, missed finals
 Northern Pride - 1st, won Grand Final

References

North Queensland Cowboys seasons
North Queensland Cowboys season